Arthur William Hoelskoetter (September 30, 1882 – August 3, 1954) was a baseball player with the St. Louis Cardinals from 1905 to 1908. Hoelskoetter was a utility player and a jack of all trades. Hoelskoetter is the only major league baseball player to have played at least 15 games as pitcher, catcher, first baseman, second baseman, third baseman, shortstop and outfielder.

External links 

Final resting place

1882 births
1954 deaths
Baseball players from St. Louis
Major League Baseball catchers
Major League Baseball second basemen
Major League Baseball third basemen
St. Louis Cardinals players
Denver Grizzlies (baseball) players
Milwaukee Brewers (minor league) players
Burials at Calvary Cemetery (St. Louis)